The Prey is a 1974 Italian-Colombian erotic drama film directed by Domenico Paolella.

Cast 

Zeudi Araya as Nagaina 
Franco Gasparri as Daniel
Micheline Presle as Betsy
Renzo Montagnani

References

External links

1974 films
1970s erotic drama films
1970s Italian-language films
Films directed by Domenico Paolella
Films set in Colombia
Italian erotic drama films
Colombian drama films
1974 drama films
1970s Italian films